Oligoplites is a genus of carangid leatherjackets native to warmer seas off the Americas, including the East Pacific, West Atlantic, Caribbean Sea and Gulf of Mexico.

Species
The currently recognized species in this genus are:
 Oligoplites altus (Günther, 1868) (longjaw leatherjacket)
 Oligoplites palometa (G. Cuvier, 1832) (Maracaibo leatherjacket)
 Oligoplites refulgens C. H. Gilbert & Starks, 1904 (shortjaw leatherjacket)
 Oligoplites saliens (Bloch, 1793) (Castin leatherjacket)
 Oligoplites saurus (Bloch & J. G. Schneider, 1801) (leatherjacket)

References

 
Scomberoidinae
Marine fish genera
Taxa named by Theodore Gill